The men's Ski cross competition of the FIS Freestyle World Ski Championships 2011 was held at Deer Valley, Utah, United States between February 3 and 4, 2011 (qualifications and finals).

46 athletes from 20 countries competed.

Results

Qualification
The following are the results of the qualification.

Elimination round

1/8 round
The top 32 qualifiers advanced to the 1/8 round. From here, they participated in four-person elimination races, with the top two from each race advancing. 

Heat 1

Heat 2

Heat 3

Heat 4

Heat 5

Heat 6

Heat 7

Heat 8

1/4 Round

Heat 1

Heat 2

Heat 3

Heat 4

1/2 Round

Heat 1

Heat 2

Final round

Small Final

Final

References

Ski cross, men's